Alan Stacey (29 August 1933 – 19 June 1960) was a British racing driver. He began his association with Lotus when he built one of the MkVI kits then being offered by the company. Having raced this car he went on to build an Eleven, eventually campaigning it at Le Mans under the Team Lotus umbrella. During the following years he spent much time developing the Lotus Grand Prix cars, most notably the front-engined 16 and then the 18. He participated in seven Formula One World Championship Grands Prix, debuting on 19 July 1958.  He scored no championship points.  He also participated in several non-championship Formula One races.

Sports car driver 

Stacey competed successfully in many sports car races driving Lotus cars, initially as a private entrant in his own car and later for Team Lotus.  He drove with Peter Ashdown in a 1098cc Lotus Eleven in the 1957 24 Hours of Le Mans but they failed to finish. He drove a Lotus XV-Climax to victory at Aintree, in a July 1959 race for sports cars of 1400cc to two litres. His time was 37 minutes 39.4 seconds.

Death 

Stacey was killed during the 1960 Belgian Grand Prix, at Spa-Francorchamps, when he crashed at  after being hit in the face by a bird on lap 25, while lying sixth in his Lotus 18-Climax (the same type Lotus as Stirling Moss, Jim Clark and Innes Ireland).

Stacey's car went off the road on the inside of the fast, sweeping right hand Burnenville curve (the same corner where Moss crashed the previous day), climbed a waist-high embankment, penetrated ten feet of thick hedges, and fell into a field. He died within a few minutes of Chris Bristow, and within a few hundred feet of that wreck. In a mid-1980s edition of Road & Track magazine, Stacey's friend and teammate Innes Ireland wrote an article about Stacey's death, in which he stated some spectators claimed a bird had flown into Stacey's face while he was approaching the curve, possibly knocking him unconscious, or even possibly killing him by breaking his neck or inflicting a fatal head injury, before the car crashed.

Personality 

Stacey's driving was "conservative" according to one observer.

More recently 

Stacey's original Lotus Mk VI was purchased from its owner by the Stacey Family and underwent complete, but sympathetic restoration in the hands of Stacey's schoolfriend, VSCC, Bentley Drivers Club and Historic Grand Prix Drivers Association racer, Ian Bentall, who had originally helped construct the car. The Lotus is still in the hands of the Stacey Family where it makes occasional appearances on the track.

Complete Formula One World Championship results 
(key)

Non-championship results
(key) (Races in bold indicate pole position)
(Races in italics indicate fastest lap)

References 

English racing drivers
English Formula One drivers
Team Lotus Formula One drivers
Racing drivers who died while racing
1933 births
1960 deaths
Sport deaths in Belgium
24 Hours of Le Mans drivers
World Sportscar Championship drivers
People from the City of Chelmsford
Sportspeople from Essex